, formally known as  is a Japanese voice actress affiliated with Kenyu Office, where she joined the agency from April 1, 2015. She was formerly affiliated with Aoni Production and Aksent.

Biography
On January 5, 2017, Shinnosuke Tachibana's blog reported that she married with Shinnosuke.

Filmography

Anime
2004
Diamond Daydreams as Karin Shiraishi

2007
Bakugan Battle Brawlers as Shiori Kazami; Joe's Mother
Bokurano as Chizuru Honda
Minami-ke as Riko

2008
Minami-ke: Okawari as Riko, Reporter
Nodame Cantabile: Paris-Hen as Catherine
A Certain Magical Index as Researcher

2009
Asura Cryin' 2 as Hiwako Torishima
Black Butler as Matilda Simmons
Minami-ke: Okaeri as Riko

2010
House of Five Leaves as Okinu
Jewelpet Twinkle☆ as Jewelina
Sekirei: Pure Engagement as Taki
The Betrayal Knows My Name as Doll D; Female Duras; Young Shusei

2011
Blue Exorcist as Noriko Paku
Level E as Saki

2012
Gon as Mū
Jormungand as Margaret "Maggie" Messner
Jormungand: Perfect Order as Margaret "Maggie" Messner
Natsume Yūjin-chō Shi as Yōko

2013
Kingdom as Liao
Minami-ke: Tadaima as Riko

2014
Date a Live II as Ryōko Kusakabe
Daimidaler: Prince vs Penguin Empire as Chieko Kakazu

2019
Vinland Saga as Helga

Dubbing
East of Eden, Gook Young-ran/Grace (Lee Yeon-hee)
Fired Up!, Bianca (Danneel Harris)
Get Smart's Bruce and Lloyd: Out of Control, Nina (Jayma Mays)
Gossip Girl, Amanda Lasher (Laura-Leigh)
The Prince, Angela (Jessica Lowndes)

References

External links
Official agency profile  

1979 births
Living people
Japanese video game actresses
Japanese voice actresses
Voice actresses from Saitama Prefecture